Blue Hill is a restaurant in New York City's Greenwich Village. It has been reviewed by The New York Times and New York.

Blue Hill was established in April 2000 and is owned by Dan, David, and Laureen Barber. The restaurant uses some ingredients from the Stone Barns Center for Food & Agriculture, where Dan Barber owns another restaurant, Blue Hill at Stone Barns. President Barack and First Lady Michelle Obama dined at Blue Hill on May 30, 2009. It was titled the "New Best Restaurant" by the James Beard Foundation in 2001 and "Outstanding Restaurant" in 2013.

In May 2020 due to the COVID-19 pandemic in New York City, chef Dan Barber launched the resourcED program at Blue Hill which packaged ingredients from the Stone Barns farm and included directions for customers to cook themselves. The boxes were intended to keep the restaurant and their suppliers in business when they couldn't host diners.

References

External links

Restaurants in Manhattan
Restaurants established in 2000
Drinking establishments in Greenwich Village
Michelin Guide starred restaurants in New York (state)
2000 establishments in New York City